The 30th Golden Globe Awards, honoring the best in film and television for 1972, were held on 28 January 1973.

Winners and nominees

Film

Television

Best Series - Drama
 Columbo 
America
Mannix
Medical Center
The Waltons

Best Series - Comedy or Musical
 All in the Family 
M*A*S*H
The Mary Tyler Moore Show
Maude
The Sonny & Cher Comedy Hour

Best Television Film
 That Certain Summer 
Footsteps
The Glass House
Kung Fu
A War of Children

Best Actor - Drama Series
 Peter Falk - Columbo 
Mike Connors - Mannix
William Conrad - Cannon
Chad Everett - Medical Center
David Hartman - The Bold Ones: The New Doctors
Robert Young - Marcus Welby, M.D.

Best Actress - Drama Series
 Gail Fisher – Mannix 
Ellen Corby – The Waltons
Anne Jeffreys – The Delphi Bureau
Michael Learned – The Waltons
Peggy Lipton – The Mod Squad
Susan Saint James – McMillan & Wife

Best Actor - Comedy or Musical Series
 Redd Foxx - Sanford and Son 
Alan Alda - M*A*S*H
Bill Cosby - The New Bill Cosby Show
Paul Lynde - The Paul Lynde Show
Carroll O'Connor - All in the Family
Flip Wilson - The Flip Wilson Show

Best Actress - Comedy or Musical Series
 Jean Stapleton - All in the Family 
Julie Andrews - The Julie Andrews Hour
Beatrice Arthur - Maude
Carol Burnett - The Carol Burnett Show
Mary Tyler Moore - The Mary Tyler Moore Show

Best Supporting Actor
 James Brolin - Marcus Welby, M.D. 
Edward Asner - The Mary Tyler Moore Show
Ted Knight - The Mary Tyler Moore Show
Harvey Korman - The Carol Burnett Show
Rob Reiner - All in the Family

Best Supporting Actress
 Ruth Buzzi - Rowan & Martin's Laugh-In 
Susan Dey - The Partridge Family
Valerie Harper - The Mary Tyler Moore Show
Vicki Lawrence - The Carol Burnett Show
Audra Lindley - Bridget Loves Bernie
Sally Struthers - All in the Family
Elena Verdugo - Marcus Welby, M.D.

References
IMdb 1973 Golden Globe Awards

030
1972 film awards
1972 television awards
January 1973 events in the United States
1972 awards in the United States